Areca novohibernica is a plant species native to the Solomon Islands and the Bismarck Archipelago in the Pacific Ocean east of New Guinea.

Gallery

References

novohibernica
Flora of the Solomon Islands (archipelago)
Flora of the Bismarck Archipelago
Vulnerable plants
Taxa named by Odoardo Beccari